Schnarr (Middle Low German, Middle High German snar "string", snarmeker "roper") is a German-language surname. Notable people with the name include:

Werner Schnarr (1903–1959), Canadian ice hockey player
Wolfgang Schnarr (born 1941), German footballer

See also 
Schnur
Seiler

German-language surnames